Demetrius II was King of the Abkhazia from circa 855 to 864. He was the second son of Leon II of the Anchabadze dynasty. He succeeded his brother Theodosius II.

Family 
Demetrius married an unknown princess:

Issue 
 Tinen, duke of Chikha (died, 871 / 877);
 Bagrat I Abkhazia, King of the Abkhazia from 882 until 894 AD.

Genealogy

Bibliography 
 Cyrille Toumanoff, Les dynasties de la Caucasie chrétienne de l'Antiquité jusqu'au XIXe siècle : Tables généalogiques et chronologiques, Rome, 1990
 Christian Settipani, Continuité des élites à Byzance durant les siècles obscurs. Les princes caucasiens et l'Empire du VIe au IXe siècle, Paris, de Boccard, 2006, 634 pàgs.,

Demetrius 02